Kaija Salopuro (born 1938) is a Finnish former footballer, who won five women's football championships with Helsingin Jalkapalloklubi between 1971 and 1975. She later worked for the Football Association of Finland, and won multiple awards for her contributions to Finnish women's football.

Personal life
Salopuro is from Ylivieska, Finland. In her early life, she participated in baseball and athletics.

Career
Salopuro moved to Helsinki to work in the offices of Helsingin Jalkapalloklubi sports club (HJK). At the time, the club was considering the creation of a women's football club. In 1971, Salopuro was the first captain of the Helsingin Jalkapalloklubi women's team. None of the players were initially paid for their participation. Between 1971 and 1975, she won five Finnish Football Championships as HJK captain. HJK also won the 1971 Finnish Women's Cup, beating Vaasan Palloseura 6-0 in the final. The match was apparently attended by just two men, who heckled the players.

Salopuro worked in the offices of HJK until 1976, when she moved to work for the Football Association of Finland. In the 1980s she worked with the Finland women's national football team. Salopuro retired from the Finnish Football Association in 2003.

Awards

In 2006, she was the first recipient of the  award for contributions to women's football. The award was named after Salopuro. In 2012, she won the Finnish . In 2013, she was inducted into HJK's Hall of Fame.

References

1938 births
Living people
Finnish women's footballers
People from Ylivieska
Football Federation of Finland executives
Women's association footballers not categorized by position
Sportspeople from North Ostrobothnia